Taylor Webster (October 1, 1800 – April 27, 1876) was an American newspaperman and politician who served three terms as a United States Representative from Ohio's 2nd congressional district from 1833 to 1839.

Biography
Born in Pennsylvania, Webster moved with his parents to Ohio in 1806, where he received a limited schooling. He briefly attended Miami University in Oxford, Ohio. He was editor and publisher of The Western Telegraph in Hamilton, Ohio, from 1828 to 1836. He served as clerk of the Ohio House of Representatives in 1829 and as a member of that body from 1831 to 1832.

Congress 
Webster was elected as a Jacksonian to the Twenty-third and Twenty-fourth Congresses and as a Democrat to the Twenty-fifth Congress (March 4, 1833 – March 3, 1839). From 1842 to 1846, he was clerk of court of Butler County, Ohio. Thereafter he resumed his business pursuits.

Later career and death 
In 1863, he relocated to New Orleans, Louisiana, to work in a clerical position and died there fourteen years later. He is interred at Lafayette Cemetery No. 1 in New Orleans.

Sources

1800 births
1876 deaths
Journalists from Pennsylvania
Pennsylvania politicians
People from Butler County, Ohio
19th-century American newspaper editors
Miami University alumni
Members of the Ohio House of Representatives
Politicians from New Orleans
Louisiana Democrats
Jacksonian members of the United States House of Representatives from Ohio
American male journalists
19th-century American politicians
Burials in Louisiana
Democratic Party members of the United States House of Representatives from Ohio